Market Street is one of the north–south streets in the central business district of Melbourne, Australia, part of the Hoddle Grid laid out in 1837. 

Market Street is the only major deviation to the Hoddle Grid, in that it only runs between Flinders Street and Collins Street, such that its vista is terminated by the art-deco Temple Court building on Collins Street.  

South of Flinders Street, the roadway continues across the Yarra River via Queens Bridge.

The street was named after the Western Market, Melbourne's first official fresh food and vegetable market, which operated on the site now occupied by Collins Arch, bordered by Collins, Market and William Streets, and Flinders Lane.

Tram route 58 runs along Market Street between Flinders Lane and Flinders Street.

See also

References

Streets in Melbourne City Centre